Hydrangea sargentiana is a species of flowering plant in the family Hydrangeaceae. It is native to western China.

Description 
This species is a shrub. It has prominent fleshy trichomes on the leaf and shoot surfaces, which are an important feature in identifying the species.

Taxonomy 
It may be confused with Hydrangea robusta Hook.f. & Thomson, which also has similar fleshy trichomes. Both species are placed within Hydrangea section Asperae.

Conservation 
The distribution is thought to be very narrow.

Gallery

References

External links
 Hydrangea sargentiana at efloras.org.

sargentiana
Flora of China
Endemic flora of China